The Vampire Diaries, an American supernatural drama, was renewed for a sixth season by The CW on February 13, 2014, and it premiered on October 2, 2014. A majority of the episode titles for this season are named after songs released in 1994 & 1903. The Vampire Diaries was renewed for a seventh season on January 11, 2015, by The CW.

Cast

Main

 Nina Dobrev as Elena Gilbert
 Paul Wesley as Stefan Salvatore
 Ian Somerhalder as Damon Salvatore
 Steven R. McQueen as Jeremy Gilbert
 Kat Graham as Bonnie Bennett
 Candice Accola as Caroline Forbes
 Zach Roerig as Matt Donovan
 Michael Trevino as Tyler Lockwood
 Matt Davis as Alaric Saltzman 
 Michael Malarkey as Enzo St. John

Recurring

 Jodi Lyn O'Keefe as Jo Laughlin
 Chris Wood as Kai Parker
 Penelope Mitchell as Liv Parker
 Marguerite MacIntyre as Liz Forbes
 Chris Brochu as Luke Parker
 Annie Wersching as Lily Salvatore
 Emily Chang as Ivy
 Gabrielle Walsh as Monique
 Tristin Mays as Sarah Nelson
 Marco James as Liam Davis

Special guest
 Colin Ferguson as Tripp Cooke

Guest

 Drew Stephenson as Colin Phelps
 Jayson Warner Smith as Dean
 Christopher Cousins as Joshua Parker
 Chris William Martin as Zach Salvatore (flashback)
 Jason MacDonald as Grayson Gilbert (flashback)
 Erin Beute as Miranda Sommers-Gilbert (voice only)

Episodes

Production

Development
Season 6 was officially announced on February 13, 2014.

Casting
The regular lineup returned from Season 5.      

It was announced, right after the finale of Season 5, that Matthew Davis's character, Alaric Saltzman, who left the show at the end of Season 3 after being killed, would return as a regular for Season 6. On May 16, 2014, it was revealed that Michael Malarkey, who portrays Enzo St. John, would become a series regular in season 6.

On July 12, 2014, Gabrielle Walsh was confirmed to have been cast in the guest role of Sarah; two days later on July 14, Colin Ferguson was cast in the guest role of Tripp; and on July 16, Emily Chang was revealed to have been cast in the role of Ivy.

On April 6, 2015, Nina Dobrev announced her departure from the series at season's end on her Instagram page. There was immediate speculation as to whether the series would continue without Dobrev, but the continuation was confirmed. It was also announced that Michael Trevino would also vacate the role of Tyler Lockwood after season 6.

Critical response
Based on 16 reviews, the sixth season holds an 81% on Rotten Tomatoes with an average rating of 7.71 out of 10. The site's critics' consensus reads, "The sixth season of The Vampire Diaries attempts to give Elena the fondest farewell amid the murderous melodrama."

References

External links
 

6
2014 American television seasons
2015 American television seasons